Anthony Joseph Genovesi (December 8, 1936 – August 10, 1998) was an American lawyer and politician from New York.

Life
He was born on December 8, 1936, in Brooklyn, New York City. He attended Xavier High School. He graduated B.S. in economics from St. Peter's College in 1958, and LL.B. from Fordham Law School in 1961. He served in the Judge Advocate General's Corps, United States Army. Afterwards he practiced law in Canarsie, Brooklyn. He married Joyce, and they had five children.

He entered politics as a Democrat, and became a top aide of Assembly Speaker Stanley Fink. Genovesi was a member of the  New York State Assembly (39th D.) from 1987 until his death in 1998, sitting in the 187th, 188th, 189th, 190th, 191st and 192nd New York State Legislatures.

He died shortly before midnight on August 10, 1998, in a car accident on New York State Route 22 in Pawling, Dutchess County, New York, while returning from the Berkshires; and was buried at the Corashire Cemetery in Monterey, Massachusetts.

References

External links

1936 births
1998 deaths
Politicians from Brooklyn
Democratic Party members of the New York State Assembly
Road incident deaths in New York (state)
Saint Peter's University alumni
Fordham University School of Law alumni
20th-century American politicians